The 2012 Ironman 70.3 World Championship was a triathlon competition held at Lake Las Vegas in Henderson, Nevada on September 9, 2012. The championship was sponsored by the United States Marine Corps and organized by the World Triathlon Corporation (WTC) and was the culmination of the Ironman 70.3 series of events that occurred from August 14, 2011 through August 13, 2012. Athletes, both professional and amateur, earned a spot in the championship race by qualifying in races throughout the 70.3 series.

Medallists

Men

Women

Qualification
The 2012 Ironman 70.3 Series featured 57 events that enabled qualification to the 2012 World Championship event, many of which were making their first appearance in the series due to WTC's expansion of the 70.3 brand. Two of those events, Japan and Syracuse, appeared twice during the qualifying year due to changes in these event's positioning within the qualifying year.

Professional triathletes qualified for the championship race by competing in races during the qualifying period, earning points towards their pro rankings. An athlete’s five highest scoring races were counted toward their pro rankings. The top 50 males and top 30 females in the pro rankings qualified for the championship race. Professional athletes were also eligible for prize purses at each qualifying event, which ranged in total size from $15,000 to $75,000.

Amateur triathletes could qualify for the championship race by earning a qualifying slot at one of the qualifying events or through the Physically Challenged Lottery. At qualifying events, slots were allocated to each age group category, male and female, with the number of slots given out based on that category's proportional representation of the overall field. Each age group category would be tentatively allocated one qualifying spot in each qualifying event. Some 70.3 events also serve as qualifiers for the full Ironman World Championships in Hawaii.

Qualifying Ironman 70.3s

†
‡
∗

2012 Ironman 70.3 Series results

Men

*Swim course shortened due to weather and safety concerns.
**Swim leg canceled due to high water.
***Swim leg canceled due to high wind. Course was a 2 mi run, 52 mi bike, and 13.1 mi run.
†Bike shortened to 15 miles due to cold weather conditions.
††Shortened to Olympic distance due to hot weather conditions.

Women

*Swim course shortened due to weather and safety concerns.
**Swim leg canceled due to high water.
***Swim leg canceled due to high wind. Course was a 2 mi run, 52 mi bike, and 13.1 mi run.
†Bike shortened to 15 miles due to cold weather conditions.
††Shortened to Olympic distance due to hot weather conditions.

Lance Armstrong
In 2012, Lance Armstrong was pursuing qualification into the 2012 Ironman World Championship. He made his return to long distance triathlon in the inaugural Ironman 70.3 Panama race, on February 12, 2012. He finished with a time of 3:50:55, second overall to Bevan Docherty. He also entered half-Ironman distance races in Texas (7th) and St. Croix (3rd) before breaking through with victories at Ironman 70.3 Florida and Ironman 70.3 Hawaii. He was scheduled to next participate in Ironman France on June 24. However, on June 13, 2012, the United States Anti-Doping Agency (USADA) accused Armstrong of doping and trafficking of drugs, based on blood samples from 2009 and 2010. Armstrong was initially suspended and eventually banned from participating in sports sanctioned by WADA. He chose not to appeal the ban. Because of the suspension and subsequent ban, Armstrong was prohibited from racing Ironman branded events to due World Triathlon Corporation anti-doping policies.

References

External links
Ironman 70.3 Series website
Professional Men Final Point Standings
Professional Women Final Point Standings

Ironman World Championship
Ironman
Triathlon competitions in the United States
Sports competitions in Nevada
Ironman 70.3 World Championship